Abeba Aregawi Gebretsadik (Amharic: አበባ አረጋዊ ;born 5 July 1990) is an Ethiopian-Swedish retired middle-distance runner who specialised in the 1500 metres. She won the bronze medal in the 1500 m at the  2012 Summer Olympics and a gold medal at the World Championships in 2013. She represented both Ethiopia and Sweden internationally.

Biography

Aregawi was born in Adigrat, Ethiopia in the Tigray Region. She represented Ethiopia internationally until December 2012, after she became a naturalized Swedish citizen. She represented the Stockholm-based club Hammarby IF to January 2016.

Aregawi was married to an Ethiopian man with Swedish citizenship and lived in Stockholm from 2009 to 2012. She is now remarried to Yemane Tsegay and lives in Addis Ababa, Ethiopia.

Athletic career

2009
Aregawi emerged as an 800 metres runner in 2009 by winning the Ethiopian title in the event ahead of three-time champion Mestawet Tadesse. She competed at a number of European meets after this then set a personal best of 2:01.98 minutes in Tangiers. Her season culminated in an 800 m bronze medal at the 2009 African Junior Athletics Championships, where she finished behind Caster Semenya.

2010
She switched to the 1500 metres in the 2010 season and enjoyed success with wins at the Sollentuna Grand Prix and KBC Night of Athletics meetings, setting a personal best of 4:01.96 minutes at the latter race. She also ran on the 2010 Diamond League circuit for the first time, coming fourth at the DN Galan and seventh at the Weltklasse Zurich.

2011
Aregawi had a strong indoor season in 2011, with four straight wins in Düsseldorf, Gent, Birmingham and Stockholm, including a personal best run of 4:01.47 minutes. However, she only made one appearance outdoors as her season was stopped due to injury.

2012
She emerged as one of the world's top 1500 m runners on the 2012 IAAF Diamond League circuit, she won also overall title of Diamond league 2012: 1500 m. She was second to Genzebe Dibaba at the Shanghai Golden Grand Prix, running a best of 3:59.23 minutes. However, she defeated her rival at the Golden Gala, breaking the Ethiopian national record with a run of 3:56.54 minutes, literally days before receiving Swedish citizenship, then won again at the Bislett Games. Aregawi won both the 800 m and the 1500 m for Hammarby IF in the Swedish team championships on June 20.  Representing Ethiopia at the 2012 Summer Olympics, Aregawi ran the fastest time in the 1500 metres competition.  However, that was while winning the second semi-final race.  In the slow, strategic final, Aregawi came off the final turn a step behind the eventual winner Aslı Çakır Alptekin, but faded badly with 20 meters to go in the final straight, initially finishing fifth. After the race, both Alptekin and silver medalist Gamze Bulut were disqualified due to doping violations. Aregawi was subsequently re-allocated the bronze medal.

2013
Aregawi contested her first race representing Sweden at international level during the European Indoor Championships in front of her home crowd in Gothenburg, where she won the gold medal. She won the first five Diamond League events and secured the overall title with two races left. She set the Swedish national record in the 1500 at 3:56.60 (just .06 slower than her Ethiopian record the previous season) at the first Diamond League meet in Doha, Qatar. Four weeks later, she added the Swedish record at 800 metres, taking it down to 1:59.20 at the Fanny Blankers-Koen Games in Hengelo, Netherlands.  Both records took down marks by Malin Ewerlöf-Krepp that were almost 15 years old.

At the World Championships in Moscow Aregawi won the gold medal at 1500 metres, Sweden's eighth gold medal since the first championships in 1983.

2014
On 6 February, Aregawi won the 1500 m race at XL Galan in Ericsson Globe at the time of 3:57.91. The time was a new European indoor record and the second best of all time. During the indoor season she also won the World Indoor Championships and took her third straight gold medal in international championships.

Doping suspension
On February 29, 2016, the Swedish Athletics Federation stated that Aregawi had tested positive for the substance (meldonium) in January 2016. She was provisionally suspended from competing the same day. In July 2016, the Swedish Doping Commission lifted her suspension due to insufficient evidence on how long the drug - which was prohibited only January 2016 - takes to be excreted from the body.

Aregawi was officially struck from the list of active athletes by the Swedish Athletics Association on 28 November 2018.

Achievements

Main victories
 = IAAF Diamond League event

2011
 PSD Bank Meeting, Düsseldorf
 Indoor Flanders Meeting, Ghent
 Birmingham Indoor Grand Prix, Birmingham
 XL Galan, Stockholm

2012
  Golden Gala, Rome
  Bislett Games, Oslo
  Weltklasse, Zürich
 Diamond League, World Overall winner: 1500 meters women

2013
 XL Galan, Stockholm
  Qatar Athletic Super Grand Prix, Doha
  Adidas Grand Prix, New York City
  Golden Gala, Rome
 Fanny Blankers-Koen Games, Hengelo (800 m)
  British Grand Prix, Birmingham
  Athletissima, Lausanne
  Memorial Van Damme, Brussels
 Sweden-Finland International, Stockholm
 Diamond League, World Overall winner: 1500 meters women

2014
 XL Galan, Stockholm
  Shanghai Golden Grand Prix, Shanghai
  Adidas Grand Prix, New York City
 ETCH Super League, Braunschweig

Personal bests

References

External links

Diamond League profile
Personal website
Athlete profile

Living people
1990 births
Swedish female middle-distance runners
Ethiopian female middle-distance runners
Olympic athletes of Ethiopia
Athletes (track and field) at the 2012 Summer Olympics
Athletes (track and field) at the 2016 Summer Olympics
Naturalized citizens of Sweden
World Athletics Championships athletes for Sweden
World Athletics Championships medalists
European Athletics Championships medalists
Hammarby IF Friidrott athletes
Ethiopian sportspeople in doping cases
Doping cases in athletics
Sportspeople from Tigray Region
Adigrat
Olympic bronze medalists for Ethiopia
Diamond League winners
World Athletics Indoor Championships winners
World Athletics Championships winners